Himesh Ke Dil Se is the fifth studio album by Himesh Reshammiya, produced by Reshammiya under the banner Himesh Reshammiya Melodies. It is the third album to be released by Reshammiya in 2021 following Surroor 2021 and Moods with Melodies. This album features mostly emerging singers of India, particularly contestants from Indian Idol 12.

Singers
The songs were sung by some participants of the Indian Idol 12, including the winner Pawandeep Rajan, the first runner-up Arunita Kanjilal, Sawai Bhatt, Mohammad Danish, Nihal Tauro, Ashish Kulkarni, Samyak Prasana, Sireesha Bhagavatula, Sayli Kamble and Nachiket Lele. 

Other singers including Palak Muchhal, Mohammad Irfan, Harshdeep Kaur, Aditya Narayan, Stebin Ben, Salman Ali, Arpita Mukherjee, Meer Jasu, Rupali Jagga, Shekinah Mukhiya, Aasa Singh, Ankush Bhardwaj, Garima Yajnik, Raj Barman, Shreya Bajpai, Mohammad Faiz, Ankona Mukherjee, Sristhi Bhandari, Rupam Bharnarhia, Risharb Chaturvedi, Nishtha Sharma, Snigdhajit Bhowmik, Sharad Sharma, Sunny Hindustani, Dipayan Banerjee, Neelanjana Ray, Ashutosh Kumar Jha, Amarjeet Jaikar and Rajashri Bag have also appeared on the Album.

Track listing
The first song of the album "Sanseinn" was sung by Sawai Bhatt, an Indian Idol 12 contestant who being belonged to Rajasthan, the song has some Rajsthani folk touch.

The second song, "Dagaa" was sung by another Indian Idol 12 contestant Mohammad Danish, while lyrics were written by Sameer.

The third song, "Terii Umeed" which was released on 23 July, Reshammiya's 48th birthday, was sung by Indian Idol 12's duo Pawandeep Rajan and Arunita Kanjilal.

"O Sajnaa", fourth song of the album was released on 6 September 2021, sung by Sawai Bhatt.

The fifth song, "O Saiyyonii", a peppy number, sung by Pawandeep and Arunita, was released on 14 September,

The song "Lagann Lagii" was released in two versions, one in sufi version, which was sung by Meer Jasu while the original version was sung by Mohammad Danish and Sayli Kamble.

The song "Piya Ji Ke Sanng" was sung by Arunita Kanjilal, was released on 13 October 2021. 

On 23 July 2022, on the occasion of Reshammiya's birthday, the song "Dhinakk Dhin Dhaa", sung by Ankush Bharadwaj and Shreya Bajpai, was released. The 50th song of the album, "Tu Hi Hai Sanam", sung by Pawandeep Rajan, was released on 3 August 2022.

On 12 March 2023, the song "Teri Aashiqui Ne Maarraa" which was earlier sung by Mohammad Irfan was re-released with the name "Teri Aashiqui Ne Maarraa 2.0", being sung by Amarjeet Jaikar, a Bihar-based boy who recently went viral on social media singing "Dil De Diya Hai" song from the film Masti and was offered a song by Reshammiya when he was invited in an episode of Indian Idol 13.

All songs were composed by Himesh Reshammiya, while lyrics were penned by Reshammiya, Sameer, Shabbir Ahmed, Sonia Kapoor. and Manish Shukla.

All the songs begin with a shayari by Reshammiya followed by renditions by respective singers.

Originals

Music video
All songs were released in studio version and were shot at the HR Musik Studio and the singers themselves featured in the music videos alongside instrumentalists also appear in the music videos.

Notes

References

2021 albums
Himesh Reshammiya albums
Himesh Reshammiya